Alligator Ridge is a spectacular serrated rock ridge in Antarctica, extending northeast for  from Alligator Peak in the Boomerang Range into Skelton Neve. It was mapped and named for its shape by the 1957–58 New Zealand party of the Commonwealth Trans-Antarctic Expedition, 1956–58.

References 

Ridges of Oates Land